All the Vermeers in New York is a 1990 American film written, directed and produced by Jon Jost.

Plot
Mark, a Wall Street financial broker, falls in love with a French actress at first sight, due to her resembling a Vermeer painting, and then proceeds to follow her from room to room in a museum. The broker goes up to the actress, Anna, and introduces himself which spawns a romantic relationship. Anna lives with two roommates — a wealthy woman and a female opera singer. As the relationship evolves, Mark dies from a cerebral hemorrhage while calling Anna. The film ends with Anna going into a Vermeer painting.

Production
The film was created with Jon Josts love of Vermeer paintings as a central organizing theme. This is one of his first films produced in 35mm.  Vincent Canby wrote in The New York Times the film's purpose was to show art as the last bit of humanism in a world without love. Marjorie Baumgarten, a writer for Austin Chronicle, called All the Vermeers in New York an experimental film. Emanuel Levy wrote in Cinema of Outsiders that the film is a mix of "narrative and experimental cinema".

Reception
At the Berlin International Film Festival in 1991, the film won the Caligari Film Award for "thematic or stylistic innovation in film in the Forum of New Cinema section of the festival". Roger Ebert reviewed the film, saying "When All the Vermeers in New York was over, I stayed for a moment in my seat because I didn't feel as if the film had ended. It got me involved, it got me intrigued, and my interior clock estimated that it would take another 30 minutes to conclude. And then it stopped." Ty Burr of Entertainment Weekly said  that "Jost's influences may be foreign-film gods like Godard and Ozu, but he doesn't share their contemplative humanity, and what's left smells like art-house posturing."

References

External links

1991 Sundance Film Festival description
. Artventure TV introduces the film and interviews Jon Jost.

1990 films
American independent films
Films set in New York City
Works about Johannes Vermeer
1990 independent films
1990s English-language films
1990s American films